AGATE (Atelier de Gestion de l'ArchiTEcture des systèmes d'information et de communication) is a framework for modeling computer or communication systems architecture.

It is promoted by the Délégation Générale pour l'Armement (DGA), the French government agency which conducts development and evaluation programs for weapon systems for the French military. All major DGA weapons and information technology system procurements are required to document their proposed system architecture using the set of views prescribed in AGATE.

AGATE is similar to DoDAF, promoted by U.S. Department of Defense (DoD) or MODAF, promoted by UK Ministry of Defence (MoD). It is only available in French.

Scope
AGATE defines architectural views for systems and systems of systems, covering:
 Stakes and objectives of the system
 Description of the related organizations
 processes and information flows
 Security requirements, in compliance with DGA policy
 Services of the system, and traceability with operational needs
 Logical architecture of the system
 Physical architecture of the systems, and hardware and software products used in this architecture
 Life cycle of the system

AGATE Views
An AGATE model is organized into 5 views:
 Stakes, Objectives, and context about the system
 Business architecture: describes organizations and Business processes managed by the modelized Information system
 Service-oriented architecture: describes the Services of the system.
 Logical architecture of the system
 Physical architecture of the systems, and hardware and software products used in this architecture

Representation
The AGATE meta-model is defined using a UML representation.

Visio elements for the AGATE representation are provided by the DGA.

History
The first DGA initiative for a standardized French architecture framework was initialized in July 2001, under the acronym AMAC. The denomination was changed to AGATE in November of the same year.

March 2004: Version 2.1
December 2005: Version 3

See also
Délégation Générale pour l'Armement
Department of Defense Architecture Framework (DoDAF)
NATO Architecture Framework (NAF)
British Ministry of Defence Architecture Framework (MODAF)

References

External links
AGATE page on French Defense procurement website 
short presentation of AGATE on French Defense procurement portal

Enterprise architecture frameworks
Military acquisition
Military of France